Hickory Dickory Dock is a popular English nursery rhyme.

Hickory Dickory Dock may also refer to:

 Hickory Dickory Dock (novel), a detective fiction novel by Agatha Christie
 "Hickory Dickory Dock", an episode of Teletubbies

See also
 Hickory, Dickory, and Doc, three characters from the theatrical short Space Mouse
 Hickory (disambiguation)
 Dock (disambiguation)